Coclé is a corregimiento in Penonomé District, Coclé Province, Panama with a population of 4,100 as of 2010. Its population as of 1990 was 2,903; its population as of 2000 was 3,637.

References

Corregimientos of Coclé Province